The clothing of the people in biblical times was made from wool, linen, animal skins, and perhaps silk. Most events in the Hebrew Bible and New Testament take place in ancient Israel, and thus most biblical clothing is ancient Hebrew clothing. They wore underwear and cloth skirts.

Complete descriptions of the styles of dress among the people of the Bible is impossible because the material at hand is insufficient. Assyrian and Egyptian artists portrayed what is believed to be the clothing of the time, but there are few depictions of Israelite garb. One of the few available sources on Israelite clothing is the Bible.

Israelite men

Undergarments
ezor, ḥagorThe earliest and most basic garment was the ezor (all pronunciations are approximate) or ḥagor, an apron around the hips or loins, that in primitive times was made from the skins of animals.
It was a simple piece of cloth worn in various modifications, but always worn next to the skin. Priests wore an  'ezor of linen known as a '''ephodh. If worn for mourning, it was called a saḳ.

When garments were held together by a belt or girdle, the cloth was also called an ezor or ḥagor.

kethōneth
The ezor later became displaced among the Hebrews by the kethōneth (translated into Greek as chitōn) an under-tunic, corresponding most nearly to our long shirt.
The kethōneth appears in Assyrian art as a tight-fitting undergarment, sometimes reaching only to the knee, sometimes to the ankle.
In its early form the kethōneth was without sleeves and even left the left shoulder uncovered.
In time men of leisure wore kethōneth with sleeves.
In later times, anyone dressed only in the kethōneth was described as naked; deprived of it he would be absolutely naked.sādhı̄nThe well-off might also wear a ṣādhı̄n under the kethōneth. This rather long under garment had sleeves and was of fine linen.

Outer garmentssimlāhThe simlāh,See also simlāh. was the heavy outer garment or shawl of various forms. It consisted of a large rectangular piece of rough, heavy woolen material, crudely sewed together so that the front was unstitched and with two openings left for the arms. Flax is another possible material.
It is translated into Koine Greek as "himation" (ἱμάτιον), and the ISBE concludes that it "closely resembled, if it was not identical with, the himation of the Greeks."

In the day it was protection from rain and cold, and at night when traveling Israelites could wrap themselves in this garment for warmth on their journey to Temple for the feast three times a year. They are required to gather from around the world to his holy land as scripture says in Deuteronomy 16:16. (see ).
The front of the simlāh also could be arranged in wide folds (see ) and all kinds of products could be carried in it
(See).

Every respectable man generally wore the simlāh over the kethōneth (See ), but since the simlāh hindered work, it was either left home or removed when working. (See ). From this simple item of the common people developed the richly ornamented mantle of the well-off, which reached from the neck to the knees and had short sleeves.me'īlThe me'īl (translated into Greek as stolḗ) stands for a variety of garments worn over the undergarment like a cloak, but used only by men of rank or of the priestly order.
The me'ı̄l was a costly wrap and the description of the priest's me'ı̄l was similar to the sleeveless abaya (Antiquities, III. vii. 4).
This, like the me'ı̄l of the high priest, may have reached only to the knees, but it is commonly supposed to have been a long-sleeved garment made of a light fabric.

'''addereth, ma'aṭafah
At a later period the nobles wore over the simlāh, or in place of it, a wide, many-folded mantle of state (adderet,   or ma'aṭafah) made of rich material (See ), imported from Babylon.
The leather garment worn by the prophets was called by the same name because of its width.

Religious accessories
ṣiṣit
The Torah commanded that Israelites wear tassels or fringes (ṣiṣit) attached to the corners of garments (see). Numbers 15:39 records that the tassels were to serve as reminders to keep the Lord's commandments.

tefillin
Phylacteries or tefillin (Hebrew: תְּפִלִּין) are boxes containing biblical verses attached to the forehead and arm by leather straps, and were in use by New Testament times (see ).

Headwear
Depictions show some Hebrews and Syrians bareheaded or wearing merely a band to hold the hair together. Hebrew people undoubtedly also wore head coverings similar to the modern keffiyeh, a large square piece of woolen cloth folded diagonally in half into a triangle. The fold is worn across the forehead, with the keffiyeh loosely draped around the back and shoulders, often held in place by a cord circlet. Men and women of the upper classes wore a kind of turban, cloth wound about the head. The shape varied greatly.

The High Priest would've worn a particular kind of priestly turban. In the Second Temple period, many Jews would've worn a sudra.

Footwear
na'alayim
Sandals (na'alayim) of leather were worn to protect the feet from burning sand and dampness. Sandals might also be of wood, with leather straps. Sandals were not worn in the house nor in the sanctuary (see). To walk about without sandals was otherwise a sign of great poverty or of mourning.

Israelite priests

The Torah provided for specific vestments to be worn by the priests when ministering. These unique vestments prescribed for Israelite priests when approaching altars or entering sanctuaries underwrote their status as privileged intermediaries between God and humanity.

All priests would minister barefoot in the temple.

The Priest
Those vestments which were common to all priests were:
 Priestly undergarments (Hebrew michnasayim), breeches: linen pants reaching from the waist to the knees.
 Priestly tunic (Hebrew ketonet), tunic: made of pure linen, covering the entire body from the neck to the feet, with sleeves reaching to the wrists. Those of the priests were plain, while that of the High Priest was embroidered.
 Priestly sash (Hebrew avnet) (lit. "girdle"): Those worn by the priests were of white twined linen, while that of the High Priest was of fine linen with embroidered work in blue and purple and scarlet. Josephus (Antiquities 3.7.2.) describes the girdle and its patterns as worn by the High Priest in his day.
 Priestly turban (Hebrew mitznefet): Those for priests were wound so that it formed a cone-shaped turban, called a migbahat. That of the High Priest was much larger than that of the priests and wound so that it formed a broad, flat-topped turban.

The High Priest
The high priest wore eight holy garments (bigdei kodesh). Of these, four were of the same type worn by all priests, and four were unique to him. The unique vestments were:
 Priestly robe (me'il) ("Robe of the ephod"): a sleeveless, blue robe, the lower hem of which was fringed with small golden bells alternating with pomegranate-shaped tassels in blue, purple, and scarlet—tekhelet, argaman (purple), tolaat shani.
 Ephod: a richly embroidered vest or apron with two onyx gemstones on the shoulders, on which were engraved the names of the tribes of Israel.
 Priestly breastplate (Hebrew hoshen): with twelve gems, each engraved with the name of one of the tribes; a pouch in which he probably carried the Urim and Thummim. It was fastened to the ephod.
 On the front of the turban was a golden plate inscribed with the words: "Holiness unto YHWH".

The High Priest had two sets of holy garments: the "golden garments" detailed above, and a set of white "linen garments" (bigdei ha-bad) which he wore only on the Day of Atonement (Yom Kippur).

Israelite women
simlāh, kethōneth, sādhı̄n
While a woman's garments mostly corresponded to those of men: they wore simlāh and kethōneth, they also evidently differed in some ways from those of men (see ). Also worn by women was the sadin, the finer linen underdress (see).

mițpaḥath
Furthermore, mention is made of the mițpaḥath (tichel), a kind of veil or shawl. This was ordinarily just a woman's neckcloth. Other than the use by a bride or bride to be, prostitutes and possibly others, a woman did not go veiled, except for modesty. The present custom in the Middle East to veil the face originates with Islam. According to ancient laws, it reached from the forehead, over the back of the head to the hips or lower, and was like the neckerchief of the Palestinian woman in Palestine and Israel today.

Egyptian men and women

The Jews visited Egypt in the Bible from the earliest patriarchs (beginning in ), to the flight into Egypt by Joseph, Mary, and the infant Jesus (in ). A large number of Jews (such as Jeremiah) also began permanent residence in Egypt upon the destruction of Jerusalem in 587 BC, during the Third Intermediate Period.

In Egypt, flax (linen) was the textile in almost exclusive use. The wool worn by Israelites was known, but considered impure as animal fibres were considered taboo. Wool could only be used for coats (they were forbidden in temples and sanctuaries). Egyptian fashion was created to keep cool while in the hot desert. People of lower class wore only the loincloth (or schenti) that was common to all. Slaves often worked naked. Sandals were braided with leather or, particularly for the bureaucratic and priestly classes, papyrus. Egyptians were usually barefoot. The most common headdress was the klafta or nemes, a striped fabric square worn by men.

Certain clothing was common to both genders, such as the tunic and the robe. Around 1425 to 1405 BC, a light tunic or short-sleeved shirt was popular, as well as a pleated skirt. Women often wore simple sheath dresses, and female clothing remained unchanged over several millennia, save for small details. Draped clothes, with very large rolls, gave the impression of wearing several items. Clothing of the royal family, such as the crowns of the pharaohs, was well documented. The pardalide (made of a leopard skin) was traditionally used as the clothing for priests.

Wigs, common to both genders, were worn by wealthy people of society. Made from real human and horse hair, they had ornaments incorporated into them. Heads were shaved. Usually children were represented with one lock of hair remaining on the sides of their heads.

Heavy and rather voluminous jewelry was very popular, regardless of social class. It was made from turquoise, metals like gold and silver, and small beads. Both men and women adorned themselves with earrings, bracelets, rings, necklaces and neck collars that were brightly colored.

Greek men and women

Greeks and Greek culture enters the Israelite world beginning with First Maccabees.

Clothing in ancient Greece primarily consisted of the chiton, peplos, himation, and chlamys. Despite popular imagination and media depictions of all-white clothing, elaborate design and bright colors were favored.
Greek clothing consisted of lengths of linen or wool fabric, which generally was rectangular.
Clothes were secured with ornamental clasps or pins and a belt, sash, or girdle might secure the waist.

Peplos, Chitons
The inner tunic was a peplos or chiton. The peplos was worn by women. It was usually a heavier woollen garment, more distinctively Greek, with its shoulder clasps. The upper part of the peplos was folded down to the waist to form an apoptygma. The chiton was a simple tunic garment of lighter linen, worn by both genders and all ages. Men's chitons hung to the knees, whereas women's chitons fell to their ankles. Often the chiton is shown as pleated.

Chlamys, Himation
The chlamys was made from a seamless rectangle of woolen material worn by men as a cloak.
The basic outer garment during winter was the himation, a larger cloak worn over the peplos or chiton. The himation has been most influential perhaps on later fashion.

Roman men and women

The Roman general Pompey entered Jerusalem in 37 BC, ending Jewish national independence.
During the New Testament narrative, Judea was ruled by either local client kings to the Roman Empire or as a Roman province under Roman officials.

Toga
Probably the most significant item in the ancient Roman wardrobe was the toga, a one-piece woolen garment that draped loosely around the shoulders and down the body. Togas could be wrapped in different ways, and they became larger and more voluminous over the centuries. Some innovations were purely fashionable. Because it was not easy to wear a toga without tripping over it or trailing drapery, some variations in wrapping served a practical function. Other styles were required, for instance, for covering the head during ceremonies.

Magistrates and high priests wore a special kind of toga with a reddish-purple band on the lower edge, called the toga praetexta as an indication of their status. The toga candida, an especially whitened toga, was worn by political candidates. Prostitutes wore the toga muliebris, rather than the tunics worn by most women. The toga pulla was dark-colored and worn for mourning, while the toga purpurea, of purple-dyed wool, was worn in times of triumph and by the Roman emperor.

After the transition of the Roman Republic into the Roman Empire in c. 44 BC, only men who were citizens of Rome wore the toga. Women, slaves, foreigners, and others who were not citizens of Rome wore tunics and were forbidden from wearing the toga. By the same token, Roman citizens were required to wear the toga when conducting official business. Over time, the toga evolved from a national to a ceremonial costume. Different types of togas indicated age, profession, and social rank.

Tunic, etc.
Originally the toga was worn by all Romans; free citizens were required to wear togas because only slaves and children wore tunics.By the 2nd century BC, however, it was worn over a tunic, and the tunic became the basic item of dress. Women wore an outer garment known as a stola, which was a long pleated dress similar to the Greek chitons.

Many other styles of clothing were worn and also are familiar in images seen in artwork from the period. Garments could be quite specialized, for instance, for warfare, specific occupations, or for sports. In ancient Rome women athletes wore leather briefs and brassiere for maximum coverage but the ability to compete.

See also

Israeli fashion
History of clothing and textiles
Timeline of clothing and textiles technology
Clothing in ancient Egypt
Clothing in ancient Greece
Clothing in ancient Rome
Clothing in the ancient world
Jewish religious clothing

References

Sources

External links
International Standard Bible Encyclopedia — Dress
Jewish Encyclopedia — Costume: In Biblical Times
Schaff–Herzog Encyclopedia of Religious Knowledge — Dress and Ornament, Hebrew
Encyclopaedia Biblica — Dress (Ephod, Girdle, Mantle, Shoes, Tunic, Turban, Veil)

History of clothing
Middle Eastern clothing
Hebrew Bible objects
Jewish religious clothing
History of Asian clothing